StoreDot is a developer of lithium-ion (Li-ion) batteries for electric vehicles founded in 2012 by Doron Myersdorf, Simon Litsyn, and Gil Rosenman. It is based in Herzliya, Israel.

The company was founded around developing peptide-based mobile phone displays and data storage. The company reported it was ready to commercially release these products: peptide-based displays by 2016; peptide-based batteries for mobile phones that fully charge in 30 seconds by 2016; germanium-based mobile phone batteries by 2019; electric car and aerial drone batteries that fully charges in five minutes by 2020; and scooter batteries that fully charge in under five minutes by 2021. None of the company's products were ever commercially released.

The company, as of 2022, is developing a silicon-based electric vehicle battery which it aims to commercially mass-produce in 2024.

Product development

Displays
StoreDot was founded in 2012 by Doron Myersdorf, Simon Litsyn, and Gil Rosenman, initially developing displays and storage devices based on research by Ehud Gazit. A year later its CEO, Myersdorf, said their peptide-based display technology is ready to be "packed and sold" and its related intellectual property could be sold for 300 million dollars. The displays and storage devices are based on "peptide nanocrystals", and a prototype storage device was made in 2012 that is "three times faster than conventional memory." The company's CEO said the display technology is 20% more power-efficient and 90% less costly to manufacture than OLED, and the displays were ready in 2015 for full-scale manufacturing using existing factories and manufacturing processes, and were to be commercialized by 2016. By 2019 the display technology was spun off into its own company, MolecuLED. As of 2022, MolecuLED has no employees.

Organic batteries
StoreDot reported in 2014 to have developed organic-compound peptide-based smartphone batteries capable of being fully charged within 30 seconds. The company raised over 6 million dollars in an initial investment round, and by the end of 2014 had raised another 42 million dollars. The company said its 30-second-charging organic-compound-based battery would be commercially available for smartphones by 2016, and for electric vehicles and aerial drones by 2020.

Germanium batteries
The company was developing germanium-based batteries by 2017, citing graphite-free batteries and an electric vehicle battery that fully charges in five minutes. It raised another 62 million dollars by the end of 2017, expecting "millions of cars" to be equipped with its electric vehicle battery by 2020. The company announced in 2018 that its mobile phone battery would be commercially available by 2019, and that it had plans to build a battery factory in the United States by 2022. In 2019 it announced the commercialization of a 168-cell germanium-tin battery for electric scooters, and stated that its mobile phone products would be commercially available in late 2020 and the scooter battery would be commercially available in 2021. The company's CEO said its electric car battery would have ten times as many cells as the scooter battery, charge fast enough to add 300 miles of range in under five minutes, and have a cooling system; and that its batteries did not degrade.

Silicon batteries
The company started developing silicon-based batteries in 2019 and ceased development of its germanium-based batteries in 2020. The company sent germanium sample batteries to manufacturers in place of silicon sample batteries. The company's CEO said the germanium batteries were only developed as proof-of-concept, were only meant to be sold in small quantities, and that they were never released because they weren't sufficiently differentiated from the rest of the market. In March 2022 the CEO said a battery capable of adding 100 miles of range in 5 minutes of charging would be available in 2024.

Peer review
The company acknowledged in 2015 that its scientific claims have not been peer-reviewed. A 2019 peer-reviewed study concluded that the company's claimed capabilities have no basis in published, peer-reviewed literature, and listed its unreleased products. Science journalist John Timmer could not identify in 2021 any published research about the company's battery technology.

Valuation
The company was in negotiations in March 2021 for a SPAC merger at a $3.5 billion valuation. A further funding round of 70 million dollars in 2022 gave it a $1.5 billion valuation.

References

Battery electric vehicle manufacturers
Vehicle manufacturing companies established in 2012
Engineering companies of Israel
Companies based in Herzliya
2012 establishments in Israel